Bobadilla is a surname of Spanish origin said to stem from the Arabic-Islamic origins of Abou Abdillah (أبو عبد الله). The name refers to:

List
Aldo Bobadilla (b. 1976), Paraguayan professional football player
Beatriz de Bobadilla (1440-1511), Spanish noblewoman, confidant and advisor to Queen Isabella I of Castile
Beatriz de Bobadilla y Ossorio, (1462-1501), Spanish noblewoman, ruler of La Gomera and El Hierro
Daniela Bobadilla, (b.1993), Mexican-Canadian actress
Diego López Pacheco Cabrera y Bobadilla, marqués de Villena (1599–1653), Spanish nobleman; viceroy of New Spain 1640–42
Francisco de Bobadilla (b. unknown, d. 1502), Spanish colonial administrator
Francisco Mendoza de Bobadilla (1508–1566), Spanish Roman Catholic cardinal
Geronimo de Bobadilla (b. unknown, d. 1680), Spanish Baroque painter
Isabel de Bobadilla (b. unknown, d. 1543), Spanish noblewoman, wife of Hernando de Soto; governor of Cuba
Nicholas Bobadilla (1511–1590), Spanish Roman Catholic priest; one of the first Jesuits
Raúl Bobadilla (b. 1987), Argentine professional football player
Tomás Bobadilla (1785 – 1871), Dominican Republic president, senator and magistrate

See also
Bobadilla (disambiguation)

Spanish-language surnames